XD engine is a technology used In LG HDTV’s to enhance picture quality. In addition to providing standard features such as Deinterlacing and upscaling, it also provides three user selectable enhancements

XD contrast

This feature attempts to increase the black levels and brightness of various aspects of the picture

 XD color

This alters and enhances color tones

XD Noise reduction

Provides analog and MPEG noise reduction.

High-definition television